Lingapuram is a village in Palnadu district of the Indian state of Andhra Pradesh. It is located in Amaravathi mandal of Guntur revenue division. The village forms a part of Andhra Pradesh Capital Region, under the jurisdiction of APCRDA.

Geography 

Demographics 

 Census of India, Endroyi had a population of 4,068. The total population constitute, 2,008 males and 2,058 females with a sex ratio of 1026 females per 1000 males. 480 children are in the age group of 0–6 years, with child sex ratio of 959 girls per 1000 boys. The average literacy rate stands at 56.95% with 2,041 literates.

Government and politics 

The village is administered by the  Amaravathi Mandal Parishad at the intermediate level of panchayat raj institutions.

Education 

As per the school information report for the academic year 2018–19, the village has a total of 4 Zilla/Mandal Parishad.

References 

Villages in Palnadu district